Indrans Jayan is an Indian film costume designer working predominantly in Malayalam films. He won the National Film Award for Best Costume Design in 2009 (Kutty Srank) and 2010 (Namma Gramam). Born in Kumarapuram, Trivandrum, he is the cousin of the Malayalam film actor Indrans. He has worked as costume designer for close to 300 films.

Awards
National Film Awards
2010: Best Costume Design for  Gramam  Tamil Directed By: Mohan Sharma
2009: Best Costume Design for Kutty Srank. Malayalam Directed By: Shaji N. Karun

Kerala State Film Award
2011: Veeraputhran- P. T. Kunju Muhammed Malayalam

Other awards
2004: Film Critics Award -  Kuberan (2002 film) - Sunderdas 
2011: Surya TV & Film Producers Award - Veeraputhran

Selected filmography
Jaadhakam
Radha Madhavam Directed by: Suresh Unnithan and Written by Lohithadas
Pakshe Directed by: Mohan (director)
Spadikam Directed by: Bhadran (director)
Bhoothakkannadi Directed by: A. K. Lohithadas
Sukrutham  Directed by: Harikumar (director)
Udhyanapalakan Directed by: Harikumar (director)
Kuberan (2002 film) Directed by: Sundar Das
Arayannangalude Veedu Directed by: A. K. Lohithadas
Oru Cheru Punchiri Directed by: M. T. Vasudevan Nair
Vadhu Doctoranu Directed by: K. K. Haridas
Katha Nayagan (1997 film) Directed by: Rajasenan
Kutty Srank Directed by: Shaji N. Karun
Raamanam Directed by: M. P. Sukumaran Nair
Veeraputhran Directed by: P. T. Kunju Muhammed
Sundara Purushan (2001 film) Directed by: Jose Thomas
Nakshathra koodaram
Meleparambil Aanveedu 
Aniyan Bava Chetan Bava
Dilliwala Rajakumaran
Nadodimannan
Swapaanam
Adyathe kanmani
Kottaram Veettile Apputtan
Darling Darling
Namma Gramam
Gowrishankaram
AKG
out of sillubus
Kunjananthante Kada
Athishayan
Sammanam
Vasanthathinte kanal vazhikal
April fool
Ayaal
Puthukkottayile Puthumanavalan
Aalavattom
Malayali maamanu vanakkom
Our sankeerthanam pole
Bharya want Ham suhruthu
Krithyam
Sadhananthante samayam
Ammaku our thaarattu
Onnam Loka Mahayudham
Chekavar
Rudrasimhasanam

References

External links
 

Indian costume designers
Costume designers of Malayalam cinema
Kerala State Film Award winners
Living people
Film people from Kerala
21st-century Indian designers
Artists from Thiruvananthapuram
Best Costume Design National Film Award winners
Year of birth missing (living people)